The Dragon Lives Again (originally released as Li san jiao wei zhen di yu men and also known as Deadly Hands of Kung Fu), is a 1977 martial arts fantasy comedy in which the soul of Bruce Lee (played by Bruce Leung Siu-lung) goes to the Underworld. There, the deceased Lee meets a number of pop-culture icons from book-based-films of the 1960s and 1970s, including Count Dracula, James Bond 007, Zatoichi, The Godfather, The Exorcist, and even modern erotic character Emmanuelle, The Man with No Name also being the only movie-based opponent to not originate from a novel. Lee befriends The One-Armed Swordsman from the Shaw Brothers Studio, Caine from Warner Brothers Television's Kung Fu, and Popeye from King Features' comics and cartoons.

The film begins with the announcement, "This film is dedicated to millions who love Bruce Lee."

Synopsis
After his untimely death, Bruce Lee (Bruce Leung Siu-lung) wakes up to find himself in the royal court of the  "Underworld". Here he meets the King of the Underworld along with his subjects. Upon questioning The King's power, the king demonstrates his displeasure by shaking a pole that can cause an earthquake through the Underworld, which gives Bruce pause.

Afterwards Bruce goes to a restaurant, where he meets and befriends Kwai Chang Caine from the TV show Kung Fu, Fang Kang from One-Armed Swordsman and cartoon sailor Popeye. He also encounters a criminal mob consisting of Dracula, James Bond, Zatoichi, and Clint Eastwood, who, as of late, have been terrorizing the denizens of the afterlife. To counter the frequent waves of attacks from the mob, Bruce sets up a martial arts school to help the victims defend themselves. Meanwhile, the criminal mob of pop culture characters, which also includes The Godfather, The Exorcist, and Emmanuelle, is revealed to be planning a coup to take over the Underworld. Among their schemes, the characters send Emmanuelle to have energetic sex with the womanizing King in the hopes that he will have a heart attack. At the same time, the mob sends Dracula to kill Bruce Lee. The plan fails, leaving Dracula dead, and Bruce Lee discovers a set of written documents that his opponent was carrying as proof of the movement against the King. Upon revealing the documents to the King, he expresses gratitude, promoting Bruce as the captain of his bodyguard.

Bruce endures a series of victorious battles with the rest of the would-be usurpers, single-handedly putting an end the attempted coup, but is still angered by the King's abuse of power. Soon enough, Bruce decides to face the King head on. However, the King is assisted by the famous Chinese folk hero Zhong Kui, who summons a band of demons to combat Bruce. The battle proves difficult for Bruce and he almost meets his match until Caine, Fang Kang and Popeye arrive in the nick of time to assist him.

Eventually Bruce and company emerge triumphant, and the King is left pleading for mercy as the infuriated Underworld civilians also approach. The King offers Bruce anything in return for sparing his life, including the throne, but Bruce rejects the offer. Bruce allows the King to keep his throne on the condition that he lets him go back to Earth and be good to his people. The King grants the wish, and Bruce is levitated back to Earth as everyone watches.

Characters

Main Hero
Bruce Lee
A once-deceased famous martial artist who lives again.

Lee's Allies
Kwai Chang Caine
A character from a series.
One-Armed Swordsman
A character from a movie.
Popeye the Sailor Man
A character from a cartoonist.

Lee's Opponents
Count Dracula 
Gothic-monster novel/movie character.
Emmanuelle 
Erotic-fantasy novel/movie character.
James Bond 007 
Action-spy novel/movie character.
Man with No Name 
A famous spaghetti-western movie character.
The Exorcist 
Supernatural-horror novel/movie character.
The Godfather 
Mafia crime-drama novel/movie character.
The King of the Underworld
Based on King Yama adapted from Buddhist beliefs.
Zatoichi 
Edo-period ronin novel/movie character.
Zombie Army (Skeletons)
Underworld revenants from Jason and the Argonauts based on the Greek myth.

Unseen Opponents
Alex DeLarge
From the book and film A Clockwork Orange
Carrie White
From the book and film Carrie
Erik the Phantom
From the book and film The Phantom of the Opera
Jay Gatsby
From the book and film The Great Gatsby
Norman Bates
From the book and film Psycho
Nurse Ratched
From the book and film One Flew Over the Cuckoo's Nest
Paul Kersey
From the book and film Death Wish
Takuma Tsurugi
From the martial-arts movie The Street Fighter
Wicked Witch of the West
From the book and film The Wizard of Oz

Cast
Of the cast, Eric Tsang, who played Popeye the sailor, now has a successful acting career in the Hong Kong film industry, gaining popularity in the Lucky Stars series (My Lucky Stars, Twinkle, Twinkle Lucky Stars), and appearing in a number of films with Jackie Chan and Sammo Hung. More recently, he won acclaim for his role in the Infernal Affairs trilogy. He has won a Golden Horse Award and two Hong Kong Film Awards.

Alexander Grand, who plays James Bond, is billed as "Champion-boxer of Europe.", while the actress who plays Emmanuelle is only billed as "Jenny, Emmanuelle of N. Europe."

Reaction
Many contemporary critics have shown affection for The Dragon Lives Again. Nobody calls it great filmmaking, but most applaud it for its ridiculousness and surrealism.  In his three-part essay about Bruceploitation for Impact Magazine, Dean Meadows said:"The Dragon Lives Again was one of the greatest and craziest of all Bruce Lee exploitation movies. Featuring the lesser known Bruce Liang, this was tongue-in-cheek from start to finish with a synopsis that was and still is unbelievable. The Little Dragon has passed over and is in purgatory anticipating judgement from the gods. Whilst there he tangles with a vast array of fictionalised and popular characters, all awaiting their individual fate. Bond is there. That's right, James Bond, along with "prince of darkness" Dracula and erotic icon, Emmanuelle. Now if that wasn't wacky enough, Bruce teams up with his good friends, Kwai Chang Caine and wait for it ... Popeye to defeat the enemy! Of course the Little Dragon does have a secret weapon, known simply as "the third leg of Bruce" (ouch!). The movie was dedicated to all fans of the great master, but whilst hilarious today, audiences would fail to see the humour at the time of its release."

In a review for Film Threat, Phil Hall awarded the film a generous four stars out of a possible five:"What any of this has to do with Bruce Lee's legacy is never entirely clear. But when you have a scenario when Clint Eastwood and James Bond are trying to take over a Chinese purgatory and Bruce Lee calls on Popeye the Sailor to help save the day (not counting the interlude for the cast to talk about Bruce Lee's penis!), it would seem that cogent and coherent thought is not high on the priority list.
The Dragon Lives Again will probably annoy enthusiasts of martial arts films and the diehard fans of Bruce Lee, but it will provide endless amusement for those who enjoy watching crazy films while filling their systems with endless mugs of beer or puffs of weed."

See also
 List of James Bond parodies

References

External links 
 

1977 films
1977 martial arts films
1970s fantasy comedy films
Hong Kong martial arts comedy films
Bruceploitation films
Kung fu films
Films about the afterlife
Popeye
James Bond
Dracula films
Emmanuelle
Cultural depictions of Clint Eastwood
Self-reflexive films
Surreal comedy films
Crossover films
1977 comedy films
Parody films based on James Bond films
1970s French films
1970s Hong Kong films